"Monster Mash" is a 1962 novelty song by Bobby "Boris" Pickett.

Monster Mash may also refer to:

Entertainment
 Monster Mash (1995 film), a horror-themed musical film, starring Bobby "Boris" Pickett
 Monster Mash (2000 film), a DIC Entertainment film

People with the nickname
 Jamal Mashburn (born 1972), American former professional basketball player

See also
Monster Bash (disambiguation)